The Communist Party of Great Britain (CPGB) was the largest communist organisation in Britain and was founded in 1920 through a merger of several smaller Marxist groups. Many miners joined the CPGB in the 1926 general strike. In 1930, the CPGB founded the Daily Worker (renamed the Morning Star in 1966). In 1936, members of the party were present at the Battle of Cable Street, helping organise resistance against the British Union of Fascists. In the Spanish Civil War the CPGB worked with the USSR to create the British Battalion of the International Brigades, which party activist Bill Alexander commanded. 

In World War II, the CPGB mirrored the Soviet position, opposing or supporting the war in line with the involvement of the USSR. By the end of World War II, CPGB membership had nearly tripled and the party reached the height of its popularity. Many key CPGB members became leaders of Britain's trade union movement, including most notably Jessie Eden, Abraham Lazarus, Ken Gill, Clem Beckett, GCT Giles, Mike Hicks, and Thora Silverthorne.

The CPGB's position on racial equality and anti-colonialism attracted many black activists to the party, including Trevor Carter, Charlie Hutchison, Dorothy Kuya, Billy Strachan, Peter Blackman, Henry Gunter, Len Johnson, and Claudia Jones, who founded London's Notting Hill Carnival. In 1956, the CPGB experienced a significant loss of members due to its support of the Soviet military intervention in Hungary. In the 1960s, CPGB activists supported Vietnamese communists fighting in the Vietnam War. In 1984, the leader of the CPGB's youth wing, Mark Ashton, founded Lesbians and Gays Support the Miners. 

From 1956 until the late 1970s, the party was funded by the Soviet Union. After the dissolution of the Soviet Union in 1991, the party's Eurocommunist leadership disbanded the party, establishing the Democratic Left. The anti-Eurocommunist faction had launched the Communist Party of Britain in 1988.

Organisational history

Formation
The Communist Party of Great Britain was founded in 1920 after the Third International decided that greater attempts should be made to establish communist parties across the world. The CPGB was formed by the merger of several smaller Marxist parties, including the British Socialist Party, the Communist Unity Group of the Socialist Labour Party and the South Wales Socialist Society. The party also gained the support of the Guild Communists faction of the National Guilds League, assorted shop stewards' and workers' committees, socialist clubs and individuals and many former members of the Hands Off Russia campaign. Several branches and many individual members of the Independent Labour Party also affiliated. As a member of the British Socialist Party, the Member of Parliament Cecil L'Estrange Malone joined the CPGB. A few days after the founding conference the new party published the first issue of its weekly newspaper, which was called the Communist and edited by Raymond Postgate.

In January 1921, the CPGB was refounded after the majorities of Sylvia Pankhurst's group the Communist Party (British Section of the Third International), and the Scottish Communist Labour Party agreed to unity. The party benefited from a period of increased political radicalism in Britain just after the First World War and the Russian Revolution of October 1917, and was also represented in Britain by the Red Clydeside movement.

During the negotiations leading to the initiation of the party, a number of issues were hotly contested. Among the most contentious were the questions of "parliamentarism" and the attitude of the Communist Party to the Labour Party. "Parliamentarism" referred to a strategy of contesting elections and working through existing parliaments. It was a strategy associated with the parties of the Second International and it was partly for this reason that it was opposed by those who wanted to break with Social Democracy. Critics contended that parliamentarism had caused the old parties to become devoted to reformism because it had encouraged them to place more importance on winning votes than on working for socialism, that it encouraged opportunists and place-seekers into the ranks of the movement and that it constituted an acceptance of the legitimacy of the existing governing institutions of capitalism. Similarly, affiliation to the Labour Party was opposed on the grounds that communists should not work with 'reformist' Social Democratic parties. These Left Communist positions enjoyed considerable support, being supported by Sylvia Pankhurst and Willie Gallacher among others. However, the Russian Communist Party took the opposing view. In 1920, Vladimir Lenin argued in his essay "Left Wing" Communism: An Infantile Disorder that the CPs should work with reformist trade unions and social democratic parties because these were the existing organisations of the working class. Lenin argued that if such organisations gained power, they would demonstrate that they were not really on the side of the working class, thus workers would become disillusioned and come over to supporting the Communist Party. Lenin's opinion prevailed eventually.

Initially, therefore, the CPGB attempted to work within the Labour Party, which at this time operated mainly as a federation of left-wing bodies, only having allowed individual membership since 1918. However, despite the support of James Maxton, the Independent Labour Party leader, the Labour Party decided against the affiliation of the Communist Party. Even while pursuing affiliation and seeking to influence Labour Party members, however, the CPGB promoted candidates of its own at parliamentary elections.

Following the refusal of their affiliation, the CPGB encouraged its members to join the Labour Party individually and to seek Labour Party endorsement or help for any candidatures. Several Communists thus became Labour Party candidates, and in the 1922 general election, Shapurji Saklatvala and Walton Newbold were both elected. As late as 1923 the National Executive Committee of the Labour Party endorsed Communist parliamentary candidates, and 38 Communists attended the 1923 Labour Party Conference.

1920s and 1930s

In 1923, the party renamed its newspaper as the Workers Weekly. In 1923, the Workers' Weekly published a letter by J. R. Campbell urging British Army soldiers not to fire on striking workers. The Labour government of Prime Minister Ramsay MacDonald prosecuted him under the Incitement to Disaffection Act but withdrew the charges upon review. This led to the Liberal Party introducing a motion to establish an inquiry into the Labour government, which led to its resignation. 

The affair of the forged Zinoviev Letter occurred during the subsequent general election late October 1924. Intended to suggest that the Communist Party in Britain was engaged in subversive activities among the British Armed Forces and elsewhere, the forgery's aim was to promote the electoral chances of the Conservative Party in the general election of 29 October; it was probably the work of SIS (MI6) or White Russian counter-revolutionaries. 

After Labour lost to the Conservative Party in the election, it blamed the Zinoviev Letter for its defeat. In the aftermath of the Campbell Case and the Zinoviev letter, Labour expelled Communist Party members and banned them from running as its parliamentary candidates in the future. After the 1926 British general strike, it also disbanded 26 Constituency Labour Parties which resisted the ruling or were otherwise deemed too sympathetic to the Communist Party. 

Throughout the 1920s and most of the 1930s, the CPGB decided to maintain the doctrine that a communist party should consist of revolutionary cadres and not be open to all applicants. The CPGB as the British section of the Communist International was committed to implementing the decisions of the higher body to which it was subordinate.

This proved to be a mixed blessing in the General Strike of 1926 immediately prior to which much of the central leadership of the CPGB was imprisoned. Twelve were charged with "seditious conspiracy". Five were jailed for a year and the others for six months. Another major problem for the party was its policy of abnegating its own role and calling upon the General Council of the Trades Union Congress to play a revolutionary role.

Nonetheless, during the strike itself and during the long drawn-out agony of the following Miners' Strike the members of the CPGB were to the fore in defending the strike and in attempting to develop solidarity with the miners. The result was that membership of the party in mining areas increased greatly through 1926 and 1927. Much of these gains would be lost during the Third Period but the influence was developed in certain areas that would continue until the party's demise decades later.

The CPGB did succeed in creating a layer of militants very committed to the party and its policies, although this support was concentrated in particular trades, specifically in heavy engineering, textiles and mining, and in addition, tended to be concentrated regionally too in the coalfields, certain industrial cities such as Glasgow and in Jewish East London. Indeed, Maerdy in the Rhondda Valley along with Chopwell in Tyne and Wear were two of a number of communities known as Little Moscow for their Communist tendencies.

During the 1920s, the CPGB clandestinely worked to train the future leaders of India's first communist party. Some of the key activists charged with this task, Philip Spratt and Ben Bradley, were later arrested and convicted as a part of the Meerut Conspiracy Case. Their trial helped to raise British public awareness of British colonialism in India, and caused massive public outrage over their treatment. At the same time, Asian and African delegates to the Comintern such as Ho Chi Minh, M. N. Roy, and Sen Katayama criticized the GBCP for neglecting colonial issues in India and Ireland. 

But this support built during the party's first years was imperilled during the Third Period from 1929 to 1932, the Third Period being the so-called period of renewed revolutionary advance as it was dubbed by the (now Stalinised) leadership of the Comintern. The result of this "class against class" policy was that the Social Democratic and Labourite parties were to be seen as equally as much a threat as the fascist parties and were therefore described as being social-fascist. Any kind of alliance with "social-fascists" was obviously to be prohibited.

The Third Period also meant that the CPGB sought to develop revolutionary trade unions in rivalry to the established Trades Union Congress affiliated unions. They met with an almost total lack of success although a tiny handful of "red" unions were formed, amongst them a miners union in Scotland and tailoring union in East London. Arthur Horner, the Communist leader of the Welsh miners, fought off attempts to found a similar union on his patch.

But even if the Third Period was by all conventional standards a total political failure it was the 'heroic' period of British communism and one of its campaigns did have impact beyond its ranks. This was the National Unemployed Workers' Movement led by Wal Hannington. Increasing unemployment had caused a substantial increase in the number of CP members, especially those drawn from engineering, lacking work. This cadre of which Hannington and Harry MacShane in Scotland were emblematic, found a purpose in building the NUWM which resulted in a number of marches on the unemployment issue during the 1930s. Although born in the Third Period during the Great Depression, the NUWM was a major campaigning body throughout the Popular Front period too, only being dissolved in 1941.

After the victory of Adolf Hitler in Germany, the Third Period was dropped by all Communist Parties as they switched to the policy of the Popular Front. This policy argued that as fascism was the main danger to the workers' movement, it needed to ally itself with all anti-fascist forces including right-wing democratic parties. In Britain, this policy expressed itself in the efforts of the CPGB to forge an alliance with the Labour Party and even with forces to the right of Labour.

In the 1935 general election Willie Gallacher was elected as the Communist Party's first MP in six years, and their first MP elected against Labour opposition. Gallacher sat for West Fife in Scotland, a coal mining region in which it had considerable support. During the 1930s the CPGB opposed the National Government's European policy of appeasement towards Nazi Germany and Fascist Italy. On the streets the party members played a leading role in the struggle against the British Union of Fascists, led by Sir Oswald Mosley whose Blackshirts tried to emulate the Nazis in anti-Semitic actions in London and other major British cities. The Communist Party's Oxford branch under the leadership of Abraham Lazarus managed to successfully contain and defeat the rise of fascism in the city of Oxford, forcing the Blackshirts to retreat from the town and into the relative safety of Oxford University after the Battle of Carfax.

1939 to 1945: Second World War

With the beginning of the Second World War in 1939, the CPGB initially continued to support the struggle on two fronts (against Chamberlain at home and Nazi fascism abroad). Following the Molotov–Ribbentrop nonaggression pact on 23 August between the Soviet Union and Germany, the Comintern immediately changed its position. The British party immediately fell in line, campaigning for peace, and describing the war as the product of imperialism on both sides, and in which the working class had no side to take. This was opposed within the CPGB by Harry Pollitt and J. R. Campbell, the editor of the Daily Worker, and both were relieved of their duties in October 1939. Pollitt was replaced by Palme Dutt. From 1939 until 1941 the CPGB was very active in supporting strikes and in denouncing the government for its pursuit of the war.

However, when in 1941 the Soviet Union was invaded by Germany, the CPGB reversed its stance immediately and came out in support of the war on the grounds that it had now become a war between fascism and the Soviet Union. Pollitt was restored to his old position as Party Secretary. In fact, the Communists' support for the war was so vociferous that they launched a campaign for a Second Front in order to support the USSR and speed the defeat of the Axis powers. In industry, they now opposed strike action and supported the Joint Production Committees, which aimed to increase productivity, and supported the National Government that was led by Winston Churchill (Conservative) and Clement Attlee (Labour). At the same time, given the influence of Rajani Palme Dutt in the Party, the issue of Indian independence and the independence of colonies was emphasised.

In the 1945 general election, the Communist Party received 103,000 votes, and two Communists were elected as members of parliament: Willie Gallacher was returned, and Phil Piratin was newly elected as the MP for Mile End in London's East End. Harry Pollitt failed by only 972 votes to take the Rhondda East constituency. Both Communist MPs, however, lost their seats at the 1950 general election. The Party was keen to demonstrate its loyalty to Britain's industrial competitiveness as a stepping point towards socialism. At the 19th Congress, Harry Pollitt asked rhetorically, "Why do we need to increase production?" He answered: "To pay for what we are compelled to import. To retain our independence as a nation."

The party's membership peaked during 1943, reaching around 60,000. Despite boasting some leading intellectuals, especially among the Communist Party Historians Group, the party was still tiny compared to its continental European counterparts. The French Communist Party for instance had 800,000 members, and the Italian Communist Party had 1.7 million members, before Benito Mussolini outlawed it in 1926. The Party tried, unsuccessfully, to affiliate to the Labour Party in 1935, 1943 and 1946.

1946 to 1956: Start of the Cold War 
In 1951 the party issued a programme, The British Road to Socialism (officially adopted at the 22nd Congress in April 1952), which explicitly advocated the possibility of a peaceful transition to socialism – but only after it had been personally approved by Joseph Stalin himself, according to some historians. The BRS would remain the programme of the CPGB until its dissolution in 1991 albeit in amended form and today is the programme of the breakaway Communist Party of Britain.

From the war years to 1956 the CPGB was at the height of its influence in the labour movement with many union officials who were members. Not only did it have immense influence in the National Union of Mineworkers but it was extremely influential in the Electrical Trade Union and in the Amalgamated Union of Engineering Workers, a key blue-collar union. In addition, much of the Labour Party left was strongly influenced by the party. Dissidents were few, perhaps the most notable being Eric Heffer, the future Labour MP who left the party in the late 1940s.

In 1954 the party solidified its opposition to British racial segregation, with the publication of A Man's a Man: A Study of the Colour Bar in Birmingham. Although the Communists had always opposed both racial segregation and British colonialism, this publication made clearer the party's position, and also had an enduring influence on British anti-racist politics outside the party.

The death of Stalin in 1953, and the uprising in East Germany the same year had little direct influence on the CPGB, but they were harbingers of what was to come. Of more importance was Nikita Khrushchev's "Secret Speech" at the 20th Congress of the Communist Party of the Soviet Union, in which he denounced Stalin. According to George Matthews, Khrushchev made a deal with the CPGB to provide a secret annual donation to the party of more than £100,000 in used notes. The Poznań protests of 1956 disrupted not only the CPGB, but many other Communist Parties as well. The CPGB was to experience its greatest ever loss of membership as a result of the Warsaw Pact's crushing of the 1956 Hungarian Revolution. "[T]he events of 1956... saw the loss of between one-quarter and one-third of Party members, including many leading intellectuals." This event was initially covered in the CPGB-sponsored Daily Worker, by correspondent Peter Fryer, but as events unfolded the stories were spiked. On his return to Britain Fryer resigned from the Daily Worker and was expelled from the party.

1957 to 1970s: Decline of the party

After the calamitous events of 1956, the party increasingly functioned as a pressure group, seeking to use its well-organised base in the trade union movement to push the Labour Party leftwards. Trade unionists in the party in 1968 included John Tocher, George Wake, Dick Etheridge and Cyril Morton (AEU); Mick McGahey, Arthur True and Sammy Moore (NUM); Lou Lewis (UCATT) and Max Morris (NUT). Ken Gill became the party's first elected officer (Deputy General Secretary of DATA, later TASS) in 1968 and former party member Hugh Scanlon was elected president of the AEU with Broad Left support – defeating Reg Birch, the Maoist ex-party candidate. The Broad Left went on to help elect Ray Buckton (ASLEF), Ken Cameron (FBU), Alan Sapper (ACTT) and Jack Jones (TGWU) in 1969. Gerry Pocock, Assistant Industrial Organiser described the industrial department as "a party within a party", and Marxism Today editor James Klugmann would routinely defer to Industrial Organiser Bert Ramelson on matters of policy.

The party's orientation, though, was to the left union officers, not the rank and file. Historian Geoff Andrews explains "it was the role of the shop stewards in organising the Broad Lefts and influencing trade union leaders that were the key rather than organising the rank and file in defiance of leaderships", and so the party withdrew from rank-and-file organisations like the Building Workers' Charter and attacked "Trotskyist" tactics at the Pilkington Glass dispute in 1970.

Still the party's efforts to establish an electoral base repeatedly failed. They retained a handful of seats in local councils scattered around Britain, but the CPGB's only representative in Parliament was in the House of Lords, gained when Wogan Philipps, the son of a ship-owner and a long-standing member of the CPGB inherited the title of Lord Milford when his father died in 1963.

The Daily Worker was renamed the Morning Star in 1966. At the same time, the party became increasingly polarised between those who sought to maintain close relations with the Soviet Union and those who sought to convert the party into a force independent of Moscow.

The international split between Moscow and Beijing in 1961 led to divisions within many Communist Parties but there was little pro-Beijing sympathy in the relatively small British Party. Perhaps the best known of the tiny minority of CPGB members who opposed the Moscow line was Michael McCreery, who formed the Committee to Defeat Revisionism, for Communist Unity. This tiny group left the CPGB by 1963. McCreery himself died in New Zealand in 1965. Later a more significant group formed around Reg Birch, an engineering union official, established the Communist Party of Britain (Marxist-Leninist). Initially, this group supported the position of the Communist Party of China.

Divisions in the CPGB concerning the autonomy of the party from Moscow reached a crisis in 1968 when Warsaw Pact forces invaded Czechoslovakia. The CPGB, with memories of 1956 in mind, responded with some very mild criticism of Moscow, refusing to call it an invasion, preferring "intervention". Three days after the invasion, John Gollan said "we completely understand the concern of the Soviet Union about the security of the socialist camp... we speak as true friends of the Soviet Union".

Even this response provoked a small localised split by the so-called Appeal Group which was in many respects a precursor of the 1977 split which formed the New Communist Party. From this time onwards, the most traditionally-minded elements in the CPGB were referred to as 'Tankies' by their internal opponents, due to their support of the Warsaw Pact forces. Others within the party leaned increasingly towards the position of Eurocommunism, which was the leading tendency within the important Communist parties of Italy and, later, Spain.

In the late-1960s, and probably much earlier, MI5 had hidden surveillance microphones in the CPGB's headquarters, which MI5 regarded as "very productive".

The last strong electoral performance of the CPGB was in the February 1974 General Election in Dunbartonshire Central, where candidate Jimmy Reid won almost 6,000 votes. However, this strong result was primarily a personal vote for Reid, who was a prominent local trade union leader and gained much support because of his prominent role in the Upper Clyde Shipbuilders work-in, which had taken place a few years earlier and was seen as having saved local jobs. Nationally the party's vote continued its decline: according to a contemporary joke, the CPGB at this time pursued the British Road to Lost Deposits.

According to historian Geoff Andrews, "The mid-1970s saw Gramscians" (otherwise known as Euro-Communists) "take leading positions within the party". Dave Cook became National Organiser in 1975 and Sue Slipman was appointed to the executive committee and to the Marxism Today editorial board. Jon Bloomfield, former Student Organiser became the West Midlands District Secretary. Pete Carter prominent in UCATT, had been gaining influence since the late 60s and was appointed National Industrial Organiser in 1982. Beatrix Campbell (a contributor, with Slipman, to Red Rag) and Judith Hunt became active in the National Women's Advisory Committee. Martin Jacques, on the executive committee since 1967, replaced James Klugmann as editor of Marxism Today in 1977. Its turn to Eurocommunism was prefigured by what Andrews describes as Sarah Benton's "radical and heretical" stint as editor of the fortnightly review Comment. Critics from the past, like Eric Hobsbawm and Monty Johnstone, also gained influence.

The Euro-Communists in the party apparatus were starting to challenge the authority of the trade union organisers. At the 1975 Congress, economist Dave Purdy proposed that "the labour movement should declare its willingness to accept voluntary pay restraint as a contribution to the success of the programme and a way of easing the transition to a socialist economy" – a challenge to the Industrial Department's policy of "free collective bargaining". An argument he reiterated in print in The Leveller in 1979.

The growing crisis in the party also affected the credibility of its leadership, as formerly senior and influential members left its ranks. In 1976, three of its top engineering cadres resigned. Jimmy Reid, Cyril Morton and John Tocher had all been members of the Political Committee, playing a crucial role in determining the direction of the party. Like another engineer, Bernard Panter, who left a few months before them, they jumped a sinking ship.

According to the Party's official historian, this period was marked by a growing division between the practitioners of cultural politics – heavily inspired by the writings of Antonio Gramsci and party's powerful industrial department which advocated a policy of militant labourism.

The cultural politics wing had dominated the party's youth wing in the 1960s and was also powerful in the student section. As such many of its members were academics or professional intellectuals (or in the view of their opponents, out of touch and middle class). They were influenced by the environmental and especially the feminist movement.

The other wing was powerful in senior levels of the trade union movement (though few actually reached the very top in the unions) and despite the party's decline in numbers were able to drive the TUC's policy of opposing the Industrial Relations Act. In the view of their opponents on the cultural or Eurocommunist wing, they were out of touch with the real changes in working people's lives and attitudes.

As the seventies progressed and as industrial militancy declined in the face of high unemployment, the tensions in the party rose even as its membership continued to decline.

1977–1991: Breakup of the party
By 1977, debate around the new draft of the British Road to Socialism brought the party to breaking point. Many of the anti-Eurocommunists decided that they needed to form their own anti-revisionist Communist party. Some speculated at the time that they would receive the backing of Moscow, but such support appears not to have materialised. The New Communist Party of Britain was formed under the leadership of Sid French, who was the secretary of the important Surrey District CP, which had a strong base in engineering.

Another grouping, led by Fergus Nicholson, remained in the party and launched the paper Straight Left. This served as an outlet for their views as well as an organising tool in their work within the Labour Party. Nicholson had earlier taken part in establishing a faction known as "Clause Four" within Labour's student movement. Nicholson wrote as "Harry Steel", a combination of the names of Stalin ("man of steel" in Russian) and Harry Pollitt. The group around Straight Left exerted considerable influence in the trade union movement, CND, the Anti-Apartheid Movement and amongst some Labour MPs.

Under the influence of Eric Hobsbawm on the opposing wing of the party Martin Jacques became the editor of the party's theoretical journal Marxism Today and rapidly made it a significant publication for Eurocommunist opinions in the party, and eventually for revisionist tendencies in the wider liberal-left, in particular for the soft left around Neil Kinnock in the Labour Party. Although the circulation of the magazine rose it was still a drain on the finances of the small party.

As early as 1983, Martin Jacques "thought the CP was unreformable... but stayed in because he needed its subsidy to continue publishing Marxism Today." Jacques' conviction that the party was finished "came as a nasty shock to some of his comrades" like Nina Temple, who "as unhappy as Jacques himself, stayed on only out of loyalty to Jacques."

In 1984, a long-simmering dispute between the majority of the leadership and an anti-Eurocommunist faction (associated with party industrial and trade union activists) flared up when the London District Congress was closed down for insisting on giving full rights to comrades who had been suspended by the executive committee. After the General Secretary closed the Congress a number of members remained in the room (in County Hall in South London) and held what was, in effect, the founding meeting of a breakaway party, although the formal split did not come until four years later. Members of the minority faction set about founding a network of Morning Star readers' groups and similar bodies, calling themselves the Communist Campaign Group. In 1988, these elements formally split from the CPGB to organise a new party known as the Communist Party of Britain. This was considered by many in the anti-Eurocommunist faction, including national executive members like Barry Williams, to be the death of the 'Party'.

In 1991, when the Soviet Union collapsed, the Eurocommunist-dominated leadership of the CPGB, led by Nina Temple, decided to disband the party, and establish the Democratic Left, a left-leaning political think tank rather than a political party. The Democratic Left itself dissolved in 1999 and was replaced by the New Politics Network, which in turn merged with Charter 88 in 2007. This merger formed Unlock Democracy, which was involved in the campaign for a yes vote in the 2011 Alternative Vote referendum.

Some Scottish members formed the Communist Party of Scotland, while others formed Democratic Left Scotland and Democratic Left Wales Chwith Ddemocrataidd. Supporters of The Leninist who had rejoined the CPGB in the early 1980s declared their intention to reforge the Party and held an emergency conference at which they claimed the name of the party. They are now known as the Communist Party of Great Britain (Provisional Central Committee) and they publish the Weekly Worker. But the Communist Party of Britain is the designated 'Communist Party' in the UK by the Electoral Commission. In 2008 members of the Party of the European Left, which contains several former communist parties in Europe, established a non-electoral British section.

Size and electoral information

The party began with 4000 members at its founding congress. It experienced a brief surge around the 1926 general strike, doubling its membership from 5,000 to over 10,000. This surge was short-lived, however, as membership eventually sank down to 2,350 by 1930. The party reached its peak in 1942 at 56,000 members. This reflected the popularity of the party in the active phase of the Second World War. In the post-war period, the membership began declining, culminating in the sudden loss of around 6,000 members in 1957, around the aftermath of the Soviet intervention in Hungary. From that point, the party gradually recovered into the early 1960s; however, it began slowly shrinking again in 1965. The downward trend continued until the leadership pushed for the dissolution of the party in 1991. The final congress recorded an overall figure of 4,742 members.

General election results

General Secretaries

Congresses
The congresses appointed/elected the Executive Committee.
{|class="wikitable"
|-
! Year
! Name
! Location
! Dates
! Executive Committee
|-
! 1920
| align="center" | Foundation Congress
| align="center" | Cannon Street Hotel, LondonInternational Socialist Club, London
| align="center" | 31 July – 1 August
| align="center" | 
|-
! 1921
| align="center" | 2nd Congress
| align="center" | Victory Hotel, Leeds
| align="center" | 29–30 January
|
|-
! 1921
| align="center" | 3rd Congress
| align="center" | Manchester
| align="center" | 23–24 April
|
|-
! 1922
| align="center" | 4th Congress
| align="center" | St Pancras Town Hall, London
| align="center" | 18–19 March
|
|-
! 1922
| align="center" | 5th Congress
| align="center" | Battersea Town Hall, London
| align="center" | 7–8 October
|
|-
! 1924
| align="center" | 6th Congress
| align="center" | Caxton Hall, Salford
| align="center" | 16–18 May
|
|-
! 1925
| align="center" | 7th Congress
| align="center" | St Mungo Hall, Glasgow
| align="center" | 30 May – 1 June
|
|-
! 1926
| align="center" | 8th Congress
| align="center" | Battersea Town Hall, London
| align="center" | 16–17 October
|
|-
! 1927
| align="center" | 9th Congress
| align="center" | Caxton Hall, Salford
| align="center" | 8–10 October
|
|-
! 1929
| align="center" | 10th Congress
| align="center" | Bermondsey Town Hall, London
| align="center" | 19–22 January
|
|-
! 1929
| align="center" | 11th Congress
| align="center" | Leeds
| align="center" | 30 November – 3 December
|
|-
! 1932
| align="center" | 12th Congress
| align="center" | Battersea Town Hall, London
| align="center" | 12–15 November
|
|-
! 1935
| align="center" | 13th Congress
| align="center" | Manchester
| align="center" | 2–5 February
|
|-
! 1937
| align="center" | 14th Congress
| align="center" | Battersea Town Hall, London
| align="center" | 29–31 May
|
|-
! 1938
| align="center" | 15th Congress
| align="center" | Birmingham Town Hall, Birmingham
| align="center" | 16–19 September
|
|-
! 1943
| align="center" | 16th Congress
| align="center" | London
| align="center" | 3–4 October
|
|-
! 1944
| align="center" | 17th Congress
| align="center" | Shoreditch Town Hall, London
| align="center" | 28–29 October
|
|-
! 1945
| align="center" | 18th Congress
| align="center" | Seymour Hall, London
| align="center" | 24–26 November
|
|-
! 1947
| align="center" | 19th Congress
| align="center" | Seymour Hall, London
| align="center" | 22–24 February
|
|-
! 1948
| align="center" | 20th Congress
| align="center" | Seymour Hall, London
| align="center" | 21–23 February
|
|-
! 1949
| align="center" | 21st Congress
| align="center" | Liverpool
| align="center" | 26–28 November
|
|-
! 1952
| align="center" | 22nd Congress
| align="center" | Battersea Town Hall, London
| align="center" | 11–14 April
|
|-
! 1954
| align="center" | 23rd Congress
| align="center" | Battersea Town Hall, London
| align="center" | 16–19 April
|
|-
! 1956
| align="center" | 24th Congress
| align="center" | Battersea Town Hall, London
| align="center" | 30 March – 2 April
|
|-
! 1957
| align="center" | 25th Congress
| align="center" | Hammersmith Town Hall, London
| align="center" | 19–22 April
|
|-
! 1959
| align="center" | 26th Congress
| align="center" | St Pancras Town Hall, London
| align="center" | 27–30 March
|
|-
! 1961
| align="center" | 27th Congress
| align="center" | St Pancras Town Hall, London
| align="center" | 31 March – 3 April
|
|-
! 1963
| align="center" | 28th Congress
| align="center" | St Pancras Town Hall, London
| align="center" | 12–15 April
|
|-
! 1965
| align="center" | 29th Congress
| align="center" | Camden Town Hall, London
| align="center" | 27–30 November
|
|-
! 1967
| align="center" | 30th Congress
| align="center" | Camden Town Hall, London
| align="center" | 25–28 November
|
|-
! 1969
| align="center" | 31st Congress
| align="center" | Camden Town Hall, London
| align="center" | 15–18 November
|
|-
! 1971
| align="center" | 32nd Congress
| align="center" | Camden Town Hall, London
| align="center" | 13–16 November
|
|-
! 1973
| align="center" | 33rd Congress
| align="center" | Camden Town Hall, London
| align="center" | 10–12 November
|
|-
! 1975
| align="center" | 34th Congress
| align="center" | Camden Town Hall, London
| align="center" | 15–18 November
|
|-
! 1977
| align="center" | 35th Congress
| align="center" | 
| align="center" | 12–15 November
|
|-
! 1979
| align="center" | 36th Congress
| align="center" | St Pancras Assembly Room, London
| align="center" | 10–13 November
|
|-
! 1981
| align="center" | 37th Congress
| align="center" | Camden Centre, London
| align="center" | 14–17 November
|
|-
! 1983
| align="center" | 38th Congress
| align="center" | 
| align="center" | 12–15 November
|
|-
! 1985
| align="center" | 39th Congress
| align="center" | 
| align="center" | 18–20 May
|
|-
! 1987
| align="center" | 40th Congress
| align="center" | 
| align="center" | 14–17 November
|
|-
! 1989
| align="center" | 41st Congress
| align="center" | 
| align="center" | 25–28 November
|
|-
! 1990
| align="center" | 42nd Congress
| align="center" | 
| align="center" | 8–9 December
|
|-
! 1991
| align="center" | 43rd Congress
| align="center" | Congress House, London
| align="center" | 22–24 November
|
|}

Notable members

 Sam Aaronovitch
 Vic Allen
 Bill Alexander
 Kingsley Amis
 Robert Page Arnot
 Mark Ashton
 George Alfred Barnard
 Joan Beauchamp
 Kay Beauchamp
 Clem Beckett
 Tom Bell
 Alfreda Benge
 Leila Berg
 J. D. Bernal
 Bill Bland
 Anthony Blunt
 Jim Bollan
 Edith Bone
 Bessie Braddock
 Benjamin Francis Bradley
 Laurence Bradshaw
 Noreen Branson
 Peter Brearey
 Maurice Brinton
 Guy Burgess
 Emile Burns
 Alan Bush
 Beatrix Campbell
 John Ross Campbell
 Trevor Carter
 Christopher Caudwell
 Frank Chapple
 Bernard Coard
 Ken Coates
 Rose Cohen
 Dave Cook                         
 Robert Conquest
 John Cornford
 Maurice Cornforth
 Bob Crow
 Jack Dash
 Edmund Dell
 George Derwent Thomson
 Mary Docherty
 Rajani Palme Dutt
 Jessie Eden
 Ben Fine
 Stewart Farrar
 Ralph Winston Fox
 Peter Fryer
 Gerry Gable
 Willie Gallacher
 Green Gartside
 David Gascoyne
 GCT Giles
 Percy Glading
 Robert Griffiths
 David Guest
 J. B. S. Haldane
 Wal Hannington
 Jock Haston
 Denis Healey
 Charlie Hutchison
 Gerry Healy
 Eric Heffer
 Margot Heinemann
 Mike Hicks
 Jim Higgins
 Christopher Hill
 Jeanne Hoban
 Eric Hobsbawm
 David Holbrook
 Malcolm Hulke
 Douglas Hyde
 Albert Inkpin
 Thomas A. Jackson
 Martin Jacques
 Len Johnson
 Claudia Jones
 David Ivon Jones
 Lewis Jones
 Pat Jordan
 Yvonne Kapp
 Luke Kelly
 Helena Kennedy
 Arnold Kettle
 Pieter Keuneman
 Victor Kiernan
 James Klugmann
 Dorothy Kuya
 Charles Lahr
 John Lawrence
 Norman Le Brocq
 Doris Lessing
 Hyman Levy
 John Lewis
 Eddie Linden
 Jack Lindsay
 James Litterick
 Ewan MacColl
 Hugh MacDiarmid
 Arthur MacManus
 Mick McGahey
 Claude McKay
 Donald Maclean
 Gordon McLennan
 Harry McShane
 Cecil L'Estrange Malone
 John Manifold
 Tom Mann
 Carl Marzani
 William Mellor
 Ivor Montagu
 A. L. Morton
 Iris Murdoch
 J. T. Murphy
 Andrew Murray
 David Nicholson
 Walton Newbold
 Melita Norwood
 Sanzo Nosaka
 Alan Nunn May
 Sylvia Pankhurst
 William Paul
 Wogan Philipps, 2nd Baron Milford
 Phil Piratin
 Harry Pollitt
 Raymond Postgate
 Annie Powell
 Tom Quelch
 Bert Ramelson
 Jimmy Reid
 John Reid
 Al Richardson
 Edgell Rickword
 Michael Roberts
 Archibald Robertson
 Andrew Rothstein
 Ralph Russell
 William Rust
 Shapurji Saklatvala
 Raphael Samuel
 John Saville
 Hugh Scanlon
 Stephen Sedley
 Alfred Sherman
 Thora Silverthorne
 Brian Simon
 Roger Simon, 2nd Baron Simon of Wythenshawe
 Derek Simpson
 Cliff Slaughter
 Sue Slipman
 John Maynard Smith
 Michael John Smith
 John Sommerfield
 Ken Sprague
 Philip Spratt
 Hedi Stadlen
 Billy Strachan
 Randall Swingler
 Tilda Swinton
 A. J. P. Taylor
 Michael Tippett
 E. P. Thompson
 Alan Thornett
 Dona Torr
 Philip Toynbee
 David Triesman
 Edward Upward
 Freda Utley
 J. O. N. Vickers
 Dorothy Wedderburn
 Sarah Wesker
 Harry Wicks
 Ellen Wilkinson
 Raymond Williams
 Alan Winnington
 Tom Wintringham
 Robert Wyatt

Origins of the term "Tankie"

"Tankie" is a pejorative term referring to those members of the Communist Party of Great Britain who followed the Kremlin line, agreeing with the crushing of the revolution in Hungary and later the Prague Spring by Soviet tanks; or more broadly, those who followed a traditional pro-Soviet position.

The term originated as a phrase for British hardline members of the Communist Party. Journalist Peter Paterson asked Amalgamated Engineering Union official Reg Birch about his election to the CPGB Executive after the Hungarian invasion:

The support of the invasion of Hungary was disastrous for the party's credibility. The CPGB opposed the invasion of Czechoslovakia in 1968, though a hardline faction supported it. The party's newspaper, the Morning Star, was banned in the Warsaw Pact countries during that time, as the paper opposed the invasion.

The term is currently used in a somewhat broader sense in Internet slang to refer to any practitioner of far-left politics, especially Marxism–Leninism or Maoism, and particularly those who defend the authoritarianism and human rights abuses of certain nominally Marxist states, such as the former Soviet Union or China.

See also
 Communist Party of Britain
 Communist Party of Great Britain (Marxist–Leninist)
 Communist Party of Great Britain (Provisional Central Committee)
 Communist Students
 Revolutionary Communist Party of Britain (Marxist–Leninist)
 Young Communist League

Further reading

Secondary sources

 Geoff Andrews Endgames and New Times: The Final Years of British Communism, 1964–1991. London: Lawrence and Wishart, 2004.
 Geoff Andrews, Nina Fishman & Kevin Morgan, Opening the Books: Essays on the Cultural and Social History of the British Communist Party. Palgrave, 1995.
 John Attfield & Stephen Williams, 1939: The Communist Party and the War. London: Lawrence and Wishart, 1984.
 Francis Beckett, Enemy Within: Rise and Fall of the British Communist Party. London: John Murray, 1995.
 Thomas Bell, The British Communist Party: a Short History. London: Lawrence and Wishart, 1937.
 Robert Black, Stalinism in Britain: A Trotskyist Analysis. London: New Park Publications, 1970.
 Sam Bornstein and Al Richardson, Two Steps Back: Communists and the Wider Labour Movement, 1939–1945. London: Socialist Platform, 1982.
 Philip Bounds, British Communism and the Politics of Literature, 1928–1939. London: Merlin Press, 2012.
 Noreen Branson, History of the Communist Party of Great Britain, 1927–1941. London: Lawrence and Wishart, 1985.
 Noreen Branson, History of the Communist Party of Great Britain, 1941–1951. London: Lawrence and Wishart, 1997.
 Daniel F. Calhoun, The United Front: The TUC and the Russians, 1923–1928. Cambridge University Press, 1976.
 John Callaghan and Ben Harker, British Communism: A Documentary History. Manchester University Press, 2011.
 John Callaghan, Cold War, Crisis and Conflict: The CPGB 1951–68. London: Lawrence and Wishart, 2003.
 John Callaghan, Rajani Palme Dutt: A Study in British Stalinism. London: Lawrence and Wishart, 1993.
 Raymond Challinor, The Origins of British Bolshevism. Croom Helm, 1977.
 Dave Cope, Bibliography of the Communist Party of Great Britain. London: Lawrence & Wishart, 2016.
 Andy Croft (ed.) A Weapon in the Struggle: The Cultural History of the Communist Party in Britain. London: Pluto Press, 1998.
 Andy Croft (ed.) After the Party: Reflections on Life Since the CPGB. London: Lawrence and Wishart, 2012.
 Richard Croucher, Engineers At War. Merlin Press, 1982.
 Ralph Darlington, The Political Trajectory of J.T. Murphy. Liverpool University Press, 1998.
 Bob (C. H.) Darke, The Communist Technique in Britain. London: Penguin, 1951.
 Hugo Dewar, Communist Politics in Britain: The CPGB from its Origin to the Second World War. London: Pluto Press, 1976.
 James Eadon and Dave Renton, The Communist Party of Great Britain since 1920. Basingstoke: Palgrave, 2002.
 Nina Fishman, Arthur Horner: A Political Biography. Volume 1 1894–1944 & Volume 2 1944–1968. London: Lawrence and Wishart, 2010.
 Nina Fishman & Kevin Morgan (eds.) The British Communist Party and the Trade Unions 1933–1945. Hants: Scolar Press, 1995.
 Nina Fishman, "The British Road is Resurfaced for New Times: From the British Communist Party to the Democratic Left." in Bull, Martin J. & Heywood, Paul M. (eds.), West European Communist Parties after the Revolutions of 1989 Palgrave, 1994.
 Paul Flewers and John McIlroy (eds.) 1956: John Saville, E.P.Thompson & The Reasoner. London: Merlin Press, 2016.
 Hywel Francis, Miners Against Fascism. London: Lawrence and Wishart, 1984.
 Jim Fyrth (ed.), Britain, Fascism and the Popular Front. London: Lawrence and Wishart, 1985.
 John Green, Britain's Communists: The Untold Story. Artery Publications, 2014.
 James Hinton, The First Shop Stewards' Movement. Allen & Unwin, 1973.
 James Hinton & Richard Hyman, Trade Unions and Revolution: Industrial Politics of the Early British Communist Party. London: Pluto Press, 1975.
 James Jupp, The Radical Left in Britain, 1931–1941. London: Frank Cass, 1982.
 Peter Kerrigan. The Communist Party. London, 1944.
 Francis King & George Matthews (eds.), About Turn: The British Communist Party and the Second World War: The Verbatim Record of the Central Committee Meetings of 25 September and 2–3 October 1939. London: Lawrence and Wishart, 1990.
 James Klugmann, History of the Communist Party of Great Britain, Volume One: Formation and Early Years, 1919–1924. London: Lawrence and Wishart, 1968.
 James Klugmann, History of the Communist Party of Great Britain, Volume Two: The General Strike, 1925–1926. London: Lawrence and Wishart, 1969.
 Keith Laybourn, Marxism in Britain: Dissent, Decline and Re-emergence 1945-c.2000. Oxon: Routledge, 2006.
 Keith Laybourn & Dylan Murphy, Under the Red Flag: The History of Communism in Britain. Stroud: Sutton Publishing, 1999.
 Thomas Linehan, Communism in Britain, 1920–39: From the Cradle to the Grave. Manchester University Press, 2007.
 L.J. Macfarlane, The British Communist Party: Its Origin and Development until 1929. London: MacGibbon and Kee, 1966.
 Stuart Macintyre, Little Moscows: Communism and Working-Class Militancy in Inter-war Britain. London: Croom Helm, 1980.
 John Mahon, Harry Pollitt: A Biography. London: Lawrence & Wishart, 1976. 
 Kevin Marsh and Robert Griffiths, Granite and Honey: the Story of Phil Piratin, Communist MP. Manifesto Press, 2012.
 Roderick Martin, Communism and the British Trade Unions, 1924–1933: A Study of the National Minority Movement. London: Clarendon Press, 1969.
 John McIlroy and Alan Campbell, ‘The early British Communist leaders, 1920–1923: a prosopographical exploration’, Labor History (2020): DOI: 10.1080/0023656X.2020.1818711
 John McIlroy and Alan Campbell, 'The leadership of British Communism, 1923-1928: pages from a prosopographical project', Labor History, vol. 62, no. 3 (2021), pp. 207-253.
 John McIlroy and Alan Campbell, 'The "core" leaders of the Communist Party of Great Britain, 1923-1928: their past, present and future', Labor History, vol. 62, no. 4 (2021), pp. 371-412.
 John McIlroy and Alan Campbell, '"Class Against Class": The leadership of the Communist Party of Great Britain during the Comintern's Third Period', Labor History, vol. 63, no. 2 (2022), pp. 145-189.
 John McIlroy and Alan Campbell, ‘Histories of the British Communist Party: a user’s guide’, Labour History Review, vol. 68, no. 1 (2003), pp. 33–60. 
 John McIlroy, Kevin Morgan & Alan Campbell (eds), Party People, Communist Lives: Explorations in Biography, London: Lawrence and Wishart, 2001.
 Kevin Morgan, Against Fascism and War: Ruptures and Continuities in British Communist Politics 1935–41. Manchester University Press, 1989.
 Kevin Morgan, Bolshevism and the British Left, Part 1: Labour Legends and Russian Gold. London: Lawrence and Wishart, 2006.
 Kevin Morgan, Bolshevism, Syndicalism and the General Strike: The Lost Internationalist World of A. A. Purcell. London: Lawrence and Wishart, 2013.
 Kevin Morgan, Gidon Cohen & Andrew Flinn, Communists and British Society 1920–1991: People of a Special Mould. London: Rivers Oram Press, 2003.
 Kevin Morgan, Harry Pollitt, Manchester University Press, 1993.
 Andrew Murray, The Communist Party of Great Britain: A Historical Analysis to 1941. Liverpool: Communist Liaison, 1995.
 Kenneth Newton, The Sociology of British Communism. Allen Lane, 1969.
 F.S. Northedge & Audrey Wells, British and Soviet Communism: The Impact of a Revolution. London: Macmillan, 1982.
 Lawrence Parker, The Kick Inside: Revolutionary Opposition in the CPGB, 1945–1991. November Publications, 2012.
 Brian Pearce and Michael Woodhouse, (Essays on the) History of Communism in Britain. 1969; Basingstoke: Macmillan, 1975; London: Bookmarks, 1995.
 Henry Pelling, The British Communist Party: A Historical Profile. London: Adam and Charles Black, 1958.
 Herbert Pimlott, "From 'Old Left' to 'New Labour'? Eric Hobsbawm and the Rhetoric of 'Realistic Marxism'," Labour/Le Travail, vol. 56 (2005), pp. 175–197.
 Neil C. Rafeek, Communist Women in Scotland: Red Clydeside from the Russian Revolution to the End of the Soviet Union. New York: I.B.Tauris, 2008.
 Neil Redfern, Class or Nation: Communists, Imperialism and Two World Wars. London: Tauris Academic Studies, 2005.
 Raphael Samuel, The Lost World of British Communism. London: Verso, 2006.
 Seifert, R. & Sibley, T. Revolutionary Communist At Work: A Political Biography of Bert Ramelson. London: Lawrence & Wishart, 2012.
 Evan Smith, British Communism and the Politics of Race. Haymarket Books, 2018.
 Evan Smith & Matthew Worley, Against the Grain: The British Far Left from 1956. Manchester University Press, 2014.
 Evan Smith & Matthew Worley, Waiting for the Revolution: The British Far Left from 1956. Manchester University Press, 2017.
 Mike Squires, Saklatvala: A Political Biography. London: Lawrence and Wishart, 1990.
 Willie Thompson, The Good Old Cause: British Communism, 1920–1991. London: Pluto Press, 1992.
 Andrew Thorpe, "The Communist International and the British Communist Party." in Tim Rees and Andrew Thorpe (eds.), International Communism and the Communist International, 1919–43. Manchester University Press, 1998.
 Andrew Thorpe, The British Communist Party and Moscow, 1920–1943. Manchester University Press, 2000.
 Nigel West, Mask: MI5's Penetration of the Communist Party of Great Britain. Routledge, 2012.
 Neal Wood, Communism and British Intellectuals. New York: Columbia University Press, 1959.
 Matthew Worley, Class Against Class: The Communist Party in Britain Between the Wars. New York: I.B. Tauris, 2002.

Primary sources

 Brian Behan, With Breast Expanded. London: MacGibbon & Kee, 1964.
 Thomas Bell, Pioneering Days. London: Lawrence and Wishart, 1941.
 Phil Cohen, Children of the Revolution: Communist Childhood in Cold War Britain. London: Lawrence and Wishart, 1997.
 Fred Copeman, Reason in Revolt. Blandford Press, 1948.
 Bob Darke, The Communist Technique in Britain, London: Penguin, 1952.
 William Gallacher, Revolt on the Clyde: an Autobiography. London: Lawrence and Wishart, 1936.
 William Gallacher, The Last Memoirs. London: Lawrence & Wishart, 1966.
 Wal Hannington, Never On Our Knees. London: Lawrence & Wishart, 1967.
 Wal Hannington, Unemployed Struggles 1919–1936. London: Lawrence & Wishart, 1936.
 Arthur Horner, Incorrigible Rebel. MacGibbon & Kee, 1960.
 Douglas Hyde, I Believed: The Autobiography of a Former British Communist. London: Heinemann, 1950.
 T.A. Jackson, Solo Trumpet. London: Lawrence & Wishart, 1953.
 Joe Jacobs, Out of the Ghetto. London: Phoenix Books, 1991.
 Alison Macleod, The Death of Uncle Joe. Merlin Press, 1997.
 Margaret McCarthy, Generation In Revolt, Heinemann: 1953.
 Harry McShane & Joan Smith, Harry McShane: No Mean Fighter. London: Pluto Press, 1978.
 Tom Mann, Tom Mann's Memoirs. Spokesman, 1978 (1923)
 J.T. Murphy, New Horizons. London: The Bodley Head, 1941.
 J.T. Murphy, Preparing For Power. Jonathan Cape, 1934 [Reissued Pluto Press: 1972]
 Will Paynter, My Generation. Allen & Unwin, 1972.
 Phil Piratin, Our Flag Stays Red. London: Thames Publications, 1948; London: Lawrence and Wishart, 1978, 2006.
 Harry Pollitt, Serving My Time: An Apprenticeship to Politics. London: Lawrence and Wishart, 1940.
 Muriel Seltman, What's Left? What's Right? Troubadour, 2010.
 Frank Watters, Being Frank. Doncaster: Frank Watters, 1992.
 Fred Westacott, Shaking the Chains. Chesterfield: Joe Clark, 2002
 Harry Wicks, Keeping My Head: The Memoirs of a British Bolshevik. London: Socialist Platform, 1992.

Notes

References

External links
 The 20th Congress and the British Communist Party by J.Saville. pdf file
 Short History of the Communist Party, Communist Party of Britain
 The Burial of the CPGB, International Library of the Communist Left
 Communist Party of Great Britain Archive Marxists Internet Archive
 A-Z of Communist Biographies by Graham Stevenson

 
Defunct communist parties in the United Kingdom